Below is a list of world heavyweight boxing championship records and statistics.

Championship recognition

As per International Boxing Hall Of Fame:

1884–1921
 Champions were recognized by public acclamation. A champion in that era was a fighter who had a notable win over another fighter and kept winning afterward. It was a lineal championship. The only way to win the championship was to beat the current champion. Retirements or disputed results could lead to a championship being split among several men for periods of time. With only minor exceptions, the heavyweight division remained free from dual title-holders until the 1960s. For an early example, see the 1896 World Heavyweight Championship.

Sanctioning organizations: 1921–present

Gradually, the role of recognizing champions in the division evolved into a more formal affair, with public acclamation being supplemented (or in some cases, contradicted) by recognition by one or more athletic commissions, sanctioning organizations, or a combination of them. The International Boxing Hall of Fame (IBHOF) recognizes these organizations as major in boxing:
 The New York State Athletic Commission (NYSAC). A governmental entity initially formed for the purpose of regulating boxing in the State of New York, thanks to New York's place as the epicenter of boxing from the 1930s through 1950s, the NYSAC expanded its reach to sanctioning championship bouts. This practice continued until, like the IBU, the NYSAC became a member of the WBC.
 The National Boxing Association (NBA) was organized in 1921.  In 1962, the organization was renamed the World Boxing Association (WBA).
 The WBC was organized in 1963.
 The IBF, which was founded in 1983 by the members of the United States Boxing Association after the USBA withdrew from membership in the WBA.
 The WBO, founded in 1988. The IBHOF started recognizing WBO as a major organization no later than August 23, 1997.

There are also titles that are not considered major, but play a significant role in legitimizing the heavyweight champion:
 The Ring began awarding championship belts in 1922, stopped giving belts to world champions in the 1990s, then reintroduced their title in 2002, and ignored the current ongoing world championship lineage. Under the original version of the policy, you could win the title by either defeating the reigning champion or winning a box-off between the magazine's No. 1 and No. 2 (occasionally No. 3) ranked contenders. A fighter could not be stripped of the title unless he lost or retired. Since May 2012, under the new policy, The Ring title can be awarded when the No. 1 and No. 2 contenders face each other or when either of them faces No. 3, No. 4 or No. 5 contender. In addition, the title can be taken away by losing the fight, not scheduling a fight for 18 months, not scheduling a fight with a top 5 contender for two years, or retiring.

Most opponents beaten in title fights 

Keys:
 Active title reign
 Reign has ended

Note: Secondary championships are not included.

All championship reigns 

The list does not include The Ring and lineal championship fights after July 2, 1921.

All championship reigns of undisputed champions/lineal champions/The Ring champions 

The list does not include The Ring and lineal championship fights after July 2, 1921, although it only includes heavyweight champions that captured undisputed championship (July 2, 1921–present), lineal championship (August 29, 1885–July 2, 1921) or The Ring championship.

Championship reigns of undisputed/lineal/The Ring champions with undisputed/lineal/The Ring/unified championships, victories over champions

The list does not include The Ring and lineal championship fights after July 2, 1921, although it only includes heavyweight champions that captured undisputed championship (July 2, 1921–present), lineal championship (August 29, 1885–July 2, 1921) or The Ring championship.

The list only includes title reigns during which the champion:
 has won undisputed championship (July 2, 1921–present), The Ring championship, lineal championship (August 29, 1885–July 2, 1921)
 held at least two major world heavyweight titles simultaneously
 defeated a fighter that either had to drop his own world title prior to the fight due to organization's championship policy or would become world heavyweight champion while the winner's reign was still active

Most wins in title fights 

Keys:
 Active title reign
 Reign has ended

All championship reigns 

The list does not include The Ring and lineal championship fights after July 2, 1921.
Note: Secondary championships are not included.

All championship reigns of undisputed champions/lineal champions/The Ring champions 

The list does not include The Ring and lineal championship fights after July 2, 1921, although it only includes heavyweight champions that captured undisputed championship (July 2, 1921–present), lineal championship (August 29, 1885–July 2, 1921) or The Ring championship.

Championship reigns of undisputed/lineal/The Ring champions with undisputed/lineal/The Ring/unified championships, victories over champions

The list does not include The Ring and lineal championship fights after July 2, 1921, although it only includes heavyweight champions that captured undisputed championship (July 2, 1921–present), lineal championship (August 29, 1885–July 2, 1921) or The Ring championship.

The list only includes title reigns during which the champion:
 has won undisputed championship (July 2, 1921–present), The Ring championship, lineal championship (August 29, 1885–July 2, 1921)
 held at least two major world heavyweight titles simultaneously 
 defeated a fighter that either had to drop his own world title prior to the fight due to organization's championship policy or would become world heavyweight champion while the winner's reign was still active

Most opponents title was successfully defended against during one reign

Keys:

 Active title reign
 Reign has ended

Note: Secondary championships are not included.

All championship reigns 

The list does not include The Ring and lineal championship fights after July 2, 1921.

Championship reigns with undisputed/lineal/The Ring championships 

The list does not include The Ring and lineal championship fights after July 2, 1921, although it only includes title reigns during which the champion captured undisputed championship (July 2, 1921–present), lineal championship (August 29, 1885–July 2, 1921) or The Ring championship.

Most consecutive title defenses 

Keys:

 Active title reign
 Reign has ended

Note: Secondary championships are not included.

All championship reigns 

The list does not include The Ring and lineal championship fights after July 2, 1921. For the purpose of this list, successful title defenses that ended in a draw are also included.

Championship reigns with undisputed/lineal/The Ring championships 

The list does not include The Ring and lineal championship fights after July 2, 1921, although it only includes title reigns during which the champion captured undisputed championship (July 2, 1921–present), lineal championship (August 29, 1885–July 2, 1921) or The Ring championship. For the purpose of this list, successful title defenses that ended in a draw are also included.

Longest title reigns 

Keys:
 Active Title Reign
 Reign has ended

Note: Secondary championships are not included.

Combined reigns

All championship reigns 

The list does not include The Ring and lineal championship fights after July 2, 1921.

As of 17 September 2022.

All championship reigns of undisputed champions/lineal champions/The Ring champions 

The list does not include The Ring and lineal championship fights after July 2, 1921, although it only includes heavyweight champions that captured undisputed championship (July 2, 1921–present), lineal championship (August 29, 1885–July 2, 1921) or The Ring championship.

As of 17 September 2022.

Championship reigns of undisputed/lineal/The Ring champions with undisputed/lineal/The Ring/unified championships, victories over champions

The list does not include The Ring and lineal championship fights after July 2, 1921, although it only includes heavyweight champions that captured undisputed championship (July 2, 1921–present), lineal championship (August 29, 1885–July 2, 1921) or The Ring championship.

The list only includes title reigns during which the champion:
 has won undisputed championship (July 2, 1921–present), The Ring championship, lineal championship (August 29, 1885–July 2, 1921)
 held at least two major world heavyweight titles simultaneously 
 defeated a fighter that either had to drop his own world title prior to the fight due to organization's championship policy or would later become world heavyweight champion while the winner's reign was still active

As of 17 September 2022.

Individual reigns

Below is a list of longest reigning heavyweight champions in boxing measured by the individual's longest reign. Both The Ring and lineal championships are included. Career total time as champion (for multiple time champions) does not apply.

All championship reigns

Championship reigns with undisputed/lineal/The Ring championships 

The list does not include The Ring and lineal championship fights after July 2, 1921, although it only includes title reigns during which the champion captured undisputed championship (July 2, 1921–present), lineal championship (August 29, 1885–July 2, 1921) or The Ring championship.

Title fight finishes

Fastest stoppages in title fights — 1st round stoppages

Fastest stoppages in title fights — undisputed/The Ring/lineal/unified championship on the line

Most opponents beaten in title fights by stoppage 

Keys:
 Active title reign
 Reign has ended

Note: The names in italics are champions that did not win undisputed championship (July 2, 1921–present), The Ring championship or lineal championship (August 29, 1885–July 2, 1921)

Most title fight wins by stoppage 

Keys:
 Active title reign
 Reign has ended

Note: The names in italics are champions that did not win undisputed championship (July 2, 1921–present), The Ring championship or lineal championship (August 29, 1885–July 2, 1921)

Highest knockout-to-beat-opponent percentage in title fights 

Keys:
 Active title reign
 Reign has ended

Note 1: The names in italics are champions that did not win undisputed championship (July 2, 1921–present), The Ring championship or lineal championship (August 29, 1885–July 2, 1921)
Note 2: Only fighters who have defeated 5 or more opponents for the world heavyweight title are included

Highest knockout-to-win percentage in title fights 

Keys:
 Active title reign
 Reign has ended

Note 1: The names in italics are champions that did not win undisputed championship (July 2, 1921–present), The Ring championship or lineal championship (August 29, 1885–July 2, 1921)
Note 2: Only fighters who have won 5 or more world heavyweight title fights are included

Champions by age 

Keys:
 Active title reign
 Reign has ended

Note: Secondary championships are not included.

Oldest champions 

This is the list of the oldest heavyweight champions ordered by age at their last day as champion.

All championship reigns

Championship reigns with undisputed/lineal/The Ring championships 

The list does not include The Ring and lineal championship fights after July 2, 1921, although it only includes title reigns during which the champion captured undisputed championship (July 2, 1921–present), lineal championship (August 29, 1885–July 2, 1921) or The Ring championship.

Youngest champions 

All championship reigns

Championship reigns with undisputed/lineal/The Ring championships 

The list does not include The Ring and lineal championship fights after July 2, 1921, although it only includes title reigns during which the champion captured undisputed championship (July 2, 1921–present), lineal championship (August 29, 1885–July 2, 1921) or The Ring championship.

Fastest world championship wins

By time elapsed from professional debut 

Ranked by the time elapsed between professional debut and world heavyweight title win.

All championship reigns

Championship reigns with undisputed/lineal/The Ring championships 

The list does not include The Ring and lineal championship fights after July 2, 1921, although it only includes title reigns during which the champion captured undisputed championship (July 2, 1921–present), lineal championship (August 29, 1885–July 2, 1921) or The Ring championship.

By number of bouts fought to win world championship 

Ranked by the number of bouts boxer fought at the professional level before winning world heavyweight title.

All championship reigns

Championship reigns with undisputed/lineal/The Ring championships 

The list does not include The Ring and lineal championship fights after July 2, 1921, although it only includes title reigns during which the champion captured undisputed championship (July 2, 1921–present), lineal championship (August 29, 1885–July 2, 1921) or The Ring championship.

Statistics by non-US country 

The list includes world heavyweight boxing champions from outside of the United States. It includes only major titles, without The Ring and lineal championships (after July 2, 1921).

Note: Secondary championships are not included.

Title fight wins & beaten opponents

All championship reigns

All championship reigns of undisputed champions/lineal champions/The Ring champions 

The list does not include The Ring and lineal championship fights after July 2, 1921, although it only includes heavyweight champions that captured undisputed championship (July 2, 1921–present), lineal championship (August 29, 1885–July 2, 1921) or The Ring championship.

Championship reigns of undisputed/lineal/The Ring champions with undisputed/lineal/The Ring/unified championships, victories over champions 

The list only includes title reigns during which the champion:
 has won undisputed championship (July 2, 1921–present), The Ring championship, lineal championship (August 29, 1885–July 2, 1921) 
 held at least two major world heavyweight titles simultaneously 
 defeated a fighter that either had to drop his own world title prior to the fight due to organization's championship policy or would become world heavyweight champion while the winner's reign was still active

Title streaks 

Only major titles, without The Ring and lineal championships (after July 2, 1921), are included.

All championship reigns 

For the purpose of this list, successful title defenses that ended in a draw are also included.

Championship reigns with undisputed/lineal/The Ring championships 

The list does not include The Ring and lineal championship fights after July 2, 1921, although it only includes title reigns during which the champion captured undisputed championship (July 2, 1921–present), lineal championship (August 29, 1885–July 2, 1921) or The Ring championship. For the purpose of this list, successful title defenses that ended in a draw are also included.

See also
List of world heavyweight boxing champions
List of current world boxing champions
List of WBA world champions
List of WBC world champions
List of IBF world champions
List of WBO world champions
List of The Ring world champions
List of undefeated boxing world champions (retired only)
List of undisputed world boxing champions

Notes

References

External links
 World Heavyweight Championship Records and Statistics
 Statistical tables of heavyweight world championships
 The Boxing Register: International Boxing Hall Of Fame Official Record Book (archive)

Heavyweight champions

Sports records and statistics